Mul-Baiyer District is a district of the Western Highlands Province of Papua New Guinea.  Its capital is Baiyer.  The population of the district was 83,036 at the 2011 census.

References

Districts of Papua New Guinea
Western Highlands Province